James Wood (January 28, 1741June 16, 1813) was an officer of the  U.S. Continental Army during the American Revolution and the 11th Governor of Virginia.

Early life
Born in Winchester, Frederick County, Virginia, on January 28, 1741, Wood was the son of an immigrant of the same name who performed surveys for Thomas Fairfax, 6th Lord Fairfax of Cameron and helped found the town.  He was educated privately and became active like his father in the local parish, Christ Episcopal Church in Winchester.

Career
In February 1760, he was appointed Deputy Clerk of the County Court. From 1766 to 1775, he served in the Virginia House of Burgesses. He married Jane Moncure, and they had no children.

Wood was commissioned a captain of Virginia troops by the Governor, Lord Dunmore, in 1774. He took part in the Battle of Point Pleasant during Dunmore's War and afterward negotiated the Treaty of Fort Pitt with the Shawnee Indians.

American Revolutionary War service
In 1776 Wood was appointed lieutenant colonel of the Frederick County Militia. In February 1777, he became commander of the 12th Virginia Regiment, and he led the regiment during the Philadelphia campaign and Monmouth campaigns of the next two years. In late 1777, he quartered at the house also occupied by the family of Sally Wister, who described him as "of the most amiable of men."  His regiment was redesignated the 8th Virginia Regiment in September 1778, and Wood was appointed Superintendent of the Convention Army when British prisoners from the Saratoga campaign were moved to Charlottesville, Virginia. He continued in that capacity until it was dissolved in January 1783, when he was promoted to brigadier general in the Virginia militia.

After the war, Wood became an original member of the Virginia Society of the Cincinnati.

Politics
From 1784 to 1796, Wood was a member of Virginia's Executive Council.

He was chosen as an elector for the 1789 election from Hampshire District.  That District consisted of Berkeley County, Frederick County, Hampshire County, Hardy County, Harrison County, Monongalia County, Ohio County and Randolph County, which cover the area which is now the eastern part of West Virginia and the northernmost county of Virginia, all within Virginia's 1st congressional district, which also included Shenandoah County.

All ten of the Virginia electors who voted cast one of their two votes for George Washington. 5 of them cast their other vote for John Adams. 3 voted for George Clinton.  1 cast his for John Hancock.  1 cast his for John Jay.  Which elector voted for which vice presidential candidate is not known.

A Federalist, in 1796, Wood was elected as Virginia's eleventh governor and served until 1799. In addition to being an original member of the Society of the Cincinnati, he was also a leading member of an early abolition society in Virginia. Wood served as President of the Society of the Cincinnati from 1802 until his death.

Death and legacy
Wood died in Richmond on June 16, 1813. He was buried at Richmond in St. John's churchyard.

James Wood High School and James Wood Middle School in Frederick County, Virginia are named after the famous Revolutionary War Colonel, as is Wood County, West Virginia.

References

External links

A Guide to the Governor James Wood Executive Papers, 1796-1799 at The Library of Virginia
James Wood at National Governors Association

1741 births
1813 deaths
Governors of Virginia
Politicians from Winchester, Virginia
Virginia Federalists
Federalist Party state governors of the United States
American militia officers
American militia generals
Continental Army officers from Virginia
Burials in Virginia
Moncure family
American abolitionists